Belciugatele may refer to:

 Belciugatele, a commune in Călărași County, Romania
 Belciugatele (river), a tributary of the river Mostiștea in Romania

See also 
 Belciug (disambiguation)
 Belciugele, a village in Romania